Julián Apezteguia (born March 3, 1974, in Buenos Aires) is an Argentine film cinematographer. Three of his most recent films have been critically well received: Bolivia (2001), 18-j (2004), and Crónica de una fuga (2006).

Filmography
 La Expresión del deseo (1998) 
 Lobos marinos (2000)
 18 cambios (2000)
 Bolivia (2001) 
 Zapada, una comedia beat (2002)
 La Felicidad (Un día de campo) (2002)
 18-j (2004) 
 Después del mar (2005)
 Crónica de una fuga (2006)  Chronicle of an Escape

Television
 Tumberos (2002) (mini) TV Series a.k.a. Tombers 
 Disputas (2003) (mini) TV Series a.k.a. Catfight

References

External links
 

1974 births
Argentine cinematographers
Living people
People from Buenos Aires